The Republic of China Air Force (ROCAF) was officially formed by the Kuomintang (KMT) after the establishment of the Aviation Ministry in 1920. As tensions mounted between China and Imperial Japan in the 1930s, air units from the Chinese warlords, including those from the Guangdong Provincial Air Force, and overseas Chinese aviators, became integrated into the centralized command of the ROCAF, nominally as the Nationalist Air Force of China, and coordinating with the Second United Front to counter the Imperial Japanese invasion and occupation.

Of all the Chinese warlord air force units to join the centralized Nationalist Chinese Air Force command, the Guangxi Clique was the last to unite, in November 1937; under the continued leadership of generals Li Zongren and Bai Chongxi, now serving in the KMT, they and their airmen would earn honorable recognition at the Battle of Taierzhuang.

Operations
During the Second Sino-Japanese War (1937–1945), which is often regarded as the beginning of World War II, the ROCAF participated in attacks on Japanese warships on the eastern front and along the Yangtze river and interdiction and close-air support during the Battle of Shanghai in 1937. Chinese sources estimated the Japanese could field approximately 600 aircraft (from a total of 1,530) against China's 230 combat-ready aircraft. As the Imperial Japanese Army Air Service and the Imperial Japanese Navy Air Service conducted mass-terror bombings against both civilian and military targets, the Chinese Air Force also planned raiding Japanese home island with the Martin B-10 bomber that was suited for the trans-oceanic raid.

The initial lineup of Chinese frontline fighter aircraft included but not limited to the Curtiss Hawk II, Hawk III, Boeing P-26C/Model 281, Fiat CR.32 among others. These engaged Japanese fighters, attack/bombers and reconnaissance aircraft in many major air battles beginning from 14 August 1937, when Imperial Japanese Navy's Kisarazu Air Group raided Jianqiao Airbase with the schnellbomber strategy, but suffering heavy losses; "814" has thus become known as "Air Force Day". Chinese Boeing P-26/281 fighters engaged Japanese Mitsubishi A5M fighters in the world's first dogfight between all-metal monoplane fighters. A long-distance "bombing raid" over Japan on 19 May 1938 saw two Chinese Martin B-10 bombers led by Captain Xu Huansheng fly into Japan, albeit dropping only anti-war leaflets over the Japanese cities of Nagasaki, Saga, Fukuoka, among others cities.

It was a war of attrition for the Chinese pilots, as many of their most experienced ace fighter pilots, such as Lieutenant , Colonel Kao Chih-hang, Yue Yiqin, among others, were lost; six months into the war, the Chinese Air Force inventory of frontline American Hawk IIs and IIIs and P-26Cs, and various others, were mostly superseded by faster and better armed Polikarpov I-15s and I-16s provided under the Sino-Soviet Treaty of 1937, including Soviet volunteer combat aviators. However, with the Fall of Nanking, the Fall of Wuhan, and the losses at the Battle of South Guangxi, the primary supply-line of China's "war of resistance" against the Imperial Japanese aggressions was dealt a further blow, not least of which the high-octane aviation fuel that was blocked-off from Chinese access, but still accessible to Imperial Japan.

After suffering heavy losses in the Battle of Wuhan in October 1938, most active air force units were withdrawn hinterland for the defense of Sichuan against the most brutal terror-bombing raids ever inflicted upon civilian populations up to that time; the massive Japanese carpet-bombing campaigns, against targets in Sichuan, under the codenames Operation 100 and 101, were also fiercely contested solely by the Chinese Air Force units and anti-aircraft artillery units, sometimes with significant Japanese losses. But as China was not an aviation-industrial power at the time, losses continued to mount, while the Japanese forces enjoyed a highly developed aviation industry that saw constantly improving cutting-edge technological advancements giving Japanese aircraft distinct performance advantages in speed, agility, altitude/climbing rate and firepower that greatly placed the increasingly underpowered and underarmed Chinese fighter aircraft hampered with low-grade fuel at tremendous disadvantage. With the introduction of Mitsubishi A6M "Zero", the most advanced fighter aircraft of the time, the Imperial Japanese gained practically complete air-supremacy by 1941, giving the Japanese military high-command full confidence in proceeding with the implementation of Operation Z (the planning and rehearsals for the attack on Pearl Harbor).

With the Japanese invasion of French Indochina, the United States enacted an oil and steel embargo against Japan and also the Lend-Lease Act on 11 March 1941, of which China was included as beneficiary on the 15th of March; the Republic of China government placed a request 1,000 aircraft to fight-back the Japanese.

Through attrition and loss of their most experienced fighter pilots in the first half of the Second Sino-Japanese War, the Republic of China Air Force suffered much irreversible losses in combat against the Japanese, and as the US imposed and by the beginning of 1942 the ROCAF was practically annihilated by Japanese aircraft, particularly due to the introduction of the A6M Zero-fighter. The ROCAF was eventually supplemented with the establishment of the American Volunteer Group (known as the "Flying Tigers") with fast and heavily armed and armored Curtiss P-40 Warhawks, employing dissimilar hit and run tactics in defense of the primary wartime Allied supply-line into China known as "The Hump", between Kunming in Yunnan province and British bases in India, while the remains of the Chinese Air Force modernized and rebuilt its strength each year following Imperial Japan's attack on Pearl Harbor, with new commitment and support from the United States.

The ROC Air Force was reconstituted into seven Groups, one separate Squadron and four Volunteer Groups. In 1939, after the USSR concluded a non-aggression pact with Germany, the Soviet Volunteer Group was withdrawn. By the end of 1941, the air force had 364 operational aircraft. Up to 100 of these were P-40Bs operated by the American Volunteer Group. U.S. replacement aircraft began to arrive in March 1942. They included A-29s, P-40s, P-43s,

In 1944, the USAAF Fourteenth Air Force commenced joint operations in the China theatre. By this time the Chinese Air Force was mostly equipped with current operational aircraft types and was superior in all respects to the opposing Japanese air forces which remained.

Units of the Chinese Airforce 1937–1945

1st Group, (bombers)
Tupolev ANT 40 SB III, VI, North American B-25 Mitchell, Northrop Gamma 2E, Northrop A-17
2nd Group, (bombers)
Tupolev ANT 40 SB III, Northrop Gamma 2E, Northrop A-17, 19 Lockheed A-29, 8 Avro 627 China built domestically as scout-bombers at Guangxi
30th Squadron: 20 Fiat BR.3
6th Group, (light bombers/scout-bombers)
21 Vought O3U/V-92C, Douglas O-2MC
7th Group, (light bombers/scout-bombers)
42 O2U Corsair, Douglas O-2MC
8th Group, (bombers)
2 Northrop Alpha 4 (converted locally to scout-bombers), 30 Ilyushin DB-3 (later into the Composite Group), North American B-25 Mitchell
10th Squadron
 10 Savoia-Marchetti S.72, 6 Caproni Ca.111
19th Squadron
 6 Heinkel He 111,  6 Tupolev TB-3
30th Squadron
 6 Martin B-10
12th Group, (bombers)
10th Squadron, (bombers)
4 Vultee A-19
3rd Group, (fighters)
Fiat CR.30, 9 Avro 626, Polikarpov E.15bis, E.15ter (E.15III, E.153), and E.16, Curtiss P-40C, P-51D, P-36 Hawk, 36 Gloster Gladiator Mk-1, P-66 Vanguard
8th Squadron (fighters
9 Fiat CR.32
17th Squadron (fighters)
11 Boeing Type 281
28th Squadron (fighters)
 Gloster Gladiator Mk-1
29th Squadron (fighters)
Gloster Gladiator Mk-1
32nd Squadron (fighters)
Gloster Gladiator Mk-1
4th Group, (fighters) 
Curtiss (Hawk III), Polikarpov E.15bis, E.15ter (E.15III, E.153) and E.16, P-40, 41 P-43 Lancer
22nd Squadron (fighters)
 9 Curtiss 68C Hawk III (F11C-3)
5th Group, (fighters)
Polikarpov E.15bis, E.15ter (E.15III, E.153), P-40N, P-51D, P-66 Vanguard
17th Squadron (fighters)
12 Dewoitine D.510
28th Squadron (fighters)
49 Curtiss Hawk-II (F11C-2)
9th Group, (fighters)
120 Curtiss 68C Hawk III (F11C-3), 20 A-12 Shrike
26th Squadron 
Curtiss A-12 Shrike
27th Squadron 
A-12 Shrike
11th Group, (fighters)
Curtiss P-40N
Russian Volunteer Group, (pursuit)
Polikarpov E.15bis, E.15ter (E.15III, E.153) and E.16
Russian Volunteer Group, (bombers)
Ilyushin DB-3, Polikarpov R-5 Scout-bombers
American Volunteer Group 'Flying Tigers', (fighters)
P-40B, P-40E
Composite Group
Temporary Organised Group-Air Cadet Flying School.(Fighter)
Curtiss 68C Hawk III (F11C-3)
12th Squadron (Reconnaissance)
 9 P-38/F-5
13th Squadron (bombers & transports)
 3 Savoia-Marchetti SM.81, 1 Spartan Executive Model 7W (lost on Dec 12, 1937).
14th International Volunteer Squadron (bombers): 20+ Vultee A-19, Northrop Gamma 2E, Northrop A-17, 3 Martin B-10
15th Squadron (dive bombers)
 10 Henschel Hs 123
18th Squadron (Scout-bombers)
 Caproni Ca.101 and Douglas O-2MC; originally stationed at Guangdong, later changed to fighters with Curtiss Hawk 75M.
27th Squadron (light bombers)
 9 Bellanca 28-90B
29th Squadron (fighters)
 6 Breda Ba.27
32nd Squadron (fighters)
 Nakajima Type 91 fighter
34th Squadron (fighters and bombers)
 14 Armstrong Whitworth Atlas, 6 Westland Wapiti, Mitsubishi Type 92.
41st French Volunteer Squadron (fighters)
 6 Dewoitine D.510

20 Focke-Wulf Fw 44 of various units
30+ de Havilland Gipsy Moth of various units, including 13 seaplane versions of Chinese navy. (All lost by the end of 1937).
Central Aviation School (trainers)
 16 Armstrong Whitworth A.W.16, also used as fighters in the early stage of the Second Sino-Japanese War.
Luoyang Aviation School (trainers)
 Breda Ba.25, Ba.28
Liuzhou Aviation School (trainers)
 Around 20 Avro Avian(616 IVM), 6 Avro Cadet, 5 Avro Tutor, 7 Nakajima Ko-4 (Japanese license produced Nieuport-Delage NiD 29 C.1)
3rd Reserve Squadron
 5 Loening C-2-H (seaplane version of Loening OA-1)
Aerial Survey Squadron
 1 Spartan C4, 1 Messerschmitt BFW M18d, Junkers W 33, Junkers W 34

Chinese air force aces

Chinese-American volunteer and/or former provincial/warlord air force pilots
John Wong Pan-Yang (黄泮扬): 13 victories (American-born Chinese air force volunteer)
John "Buffalo" Wong (黃新瑞): 8.5 victories (Chinese-born American volunteer in the CAF)
Chen Ruitian a.k.a. Arthur Chin (陳瑞鈿): 7 victories (American-born Chinese air force volunteer) 
Zhu Jiaxun (朱嘉勋 - Chu Chia-hsun) 5+ victories (former Guangxi-Bai Chongxi/Li Zongren warlord air force pilot)
Cen Zeliu (岑泽鎏 - Shim Tsak-lai, Sh'en Tse-liu): 5+ victories (former Guangdong-Chen Jitang warlord air force pilot)
Louie Yim-Qun (雷炎均): 3-5 victories (American-born Chinese air force volunteer)
Teng Li-Chun 2.5 victories, He flew 60 combat missions during WWII as a member of the Chinese-American Composite Wing (Provisional) in the 1st Wing of the 14th Air Force. He flew another 220 combat missions against the communist Chinese. He retired as a Colonel in the Republic of China Air Force with 18 Chinese military decorations and the Air Medal from the United States.

R.O.C. commissioned pilots
 : 11-1/3 (9 confirmed according to Republic of China records)
 Wang Kuang-Fu (王光復): 8
 Gao Youxin: 8 
Yuan Baokang (袁葆康): 8 victories
 : 7+
 Tsang Shi-Lan (臧錫蘭): 7
 Tan Kun (譚鯤): 5 or 6
 Yue Yiqin (樂以琴): 5
  : 5
 : 5
 Lo Ying-Te (羅英德): 5
 Leng Pei-Su (冷培澍): 5
 Chow Ting-Fong (周廷芳): 6
 Lu Ji-Chun(呂基純): 5
 : 5

Foreign aid

Soviet Union

From 1937 to the beginning of 1941, the Soviet Union served as the primary supplier to the ROCAF, and from October 1937 to January 1941, a total of 848 aircraft in 13 batches were ordered by the Chinese government and were supplied on credit, worth roughly 200 million dollars. In addition, there were 37 aircraft transferred to Chinese when Soviet force withdrew from China after the signing of Soviet–German Non-Aggression Pact.  These aircraft included 563 fighters, including 252 I-152, 75 I-153, 132 I-16 Type 5, 75 I-16 Type 10, 10 I-16 Type 17 and rest being I-15 bis, which was not part of the purchase in the 13 batches. Also included were 322 bombers, including 179 SB-2M-100A, 100 SB-2M-103 24 DB-3, 6 TB-3 and 13 SB that were not part of the purchase in the 13 batches). Also included in the 13-batch purchase were 5 UT-1 trainers.  However, of the 250–300 combat aircraft supplied annually, only a few dozen would survive through the end of the year.

United States
While the USSR provided most of the military aircraft to Chiang Kai-shek in the late 1930s, many early Chinese aircraft were supplied by the American Curtiss Aeroplane and Motor Company. In 1937 the Hawk II and Hawk III biplanes comprised the backbone of Chinese fighter aviation. These were soon followed by the Hawk 75 monoplane. The demonstration model Hawk 75N, with non-retractable landing gear was purchased in 1938 and became the personal aircraft of the American advisor to the Aviation Committee, Claire Chennault who oversaw training and lobbied for the procurement of American aircraft.

The entry of the United States into the war with Japan at the end of 1941 led to the receipt of Lend-Lease equipment from the United States, including aircraft. American Lend-Lease aviation equipment had already begun to arrive in China as early as the middle of 1941, though that includes the first shipments before January 1942 which arrived under the guise of purchases.  Including previously purchased American aircraft, US soon replaced USSR as the largest supplier for the Chinese Nationalist air force during the war (Including the Second Sino-Japanese War that actually broke out in 1931 when Japan invaded Manchuria).

Retraining on American aircraft occurred for the most part in India. (Karachi and other cities), where Chinese pilots were sent both as groups and as entire units.  As early as the end of 1941 Chinese pilots, mainly recently graduated from flight schools, began to be sent to the US for longer training and mastery of American aircraft.

The first American P-43A fighters were received by the 4th Air Group (21st – 24th Squadrons) in March 1942.  They retrained in Kunming, but for the new aircraft the pilots sequentially flew in small groups to India.  On 24 April the deputy commander of the 24th Squadron, Wu Zhenhua, crashed on the flight to Kunming.  On 12 May, Chen Lokun, the flight commander of the 24th Squadron was killed during a training flight, crashing into a tree during landing.  In July for unclear reasons the P-43 of the 4th Air Group commander, Zheng Shaoyu, caught fire in the air and the pilot was killed.  On 3 August 1942 during a training flight the deputy group commander Chen Sheng crashed.  A similar series of crashes accompanied the mastery by the Chinese of almost every new machine.  (It is notable that in Chinese sources the family names are given only of the perished commanders of various ranks, while the losses amongst the line pilots are hardly even noted.) Concluding their conversion to the P-43A in early August 1942, the group returned to Chengdu.

In February 1943, preparing for transition to the new American air equipment, the Chinese transferred to India the primary training groups from their flight schools.  Only training for reconnaissance and photography continued to be carried out in China. In March 1945 the cadets completing primary training in India were sent to America to train further.  By that time the number of cadets dispatched had reached 1224, of whom 384 managed to return to China and participate in combat.  In all, from 1942 to 1945 420 training aircraft were sent from the US to China through India, including 20 AT-6, 8 AT-7, 15 AT-17, 150 PT-17, 127 PT-19, 70 PT-22, and 30 BT-13, and also 10 Beechcraft D-17 medical aircraft.

Domestic assembly of aircraft
While the modified Hawk 75M with retractable landing gear was created specially for China, it was not widely used in the war against the Japanese. Thirty aircraft, and 82 kits for assembly were delivered in the summer and autumn of 1938. It was planned to assemble the Hawk in a factory operated by the Central Aircraft Manufacturing Company, which had been evacuated from Hankou to Loiwing. The latter location, not far from the Burmese border on the eastern bank of the Ruiluqiang River in Yunnan Province, at that time seemed protected from Japanese attacks, but technical difficulties plagued the actual assembly of the Hawk 75 in that location. Although the Japanese had not bombed the factory, only eight machines were assembled by October 1940. The fate of the remaining kits is unknown.

Following the failure of Hawk 75 production, the CAMCO factory planned to organize assembly of the export version of the Curtiss-Wright CW-21 "Demon" interceptor. Three aircraft and 32 sets of components were ordered from the US. The factory at Loiwing worked until April 1942 when, due to Japanese attacks, it had to be evacuated to Kunming and its American personnel set up shop in India.

Japanese advances in Burma in late-1942 forced the 1st Air Force Aircraft Manufacturing Factory (1st AFAMF) to move hinterland to Guiyang, Guizhou province, where the Chinese government was attempting an innovative and ambitious indigenously designed swept-forward gull-winged fighter plane called the XP-1, in hopes to reduce reliance on foreign sources. From 1943 to 1946 the CAMCO factory, which was dispersed in the ravines neighboring Kunming, assembled an experimental series of nine fighter monoplanes, probably from  Hawk 75M, 75A-5, and CW-21 components.  To a degree they were similar to the American prototypes and their further fate is unknown. In western sources the first example figures under the designation Chu XP-0.

Ranks

Officers

Other ranks

See also
 Air Warfare of WWII from the Sino-Japanese War perspective
 Aerial engagements of the Second Sino-Japanese War
 Soong Mei-ling
 Xu Huansheng

Notes

References

 Cheung, Raymond. Aces of the Republic of China Air Force. OSPREY AIRCRAFT OF THE ACES 126 Oxford: Bloomsbury Publishing Plc, 2015. .
 Howarth, Stephen. THE FIGHTING SHIPS OF THE RISING SUN: The Drama of the Imperial Japanese Navy 1895–1945. Fairfield, Pennsylvania: Fairfield Graphics, 1983. .
 Caidin, Martin. Zero Fighter: Ballantine's Illustrated History of World War II Weapons Book No. 9. New York, NY: Ballantine Books Inc, 1969. .
 徐 (Xú), 露梅 (Lùméi). 隕落 (Fallen): 682位空军英烈的生死档案 - 抗战空军英烈档案大解密 (A Decryption of 682 Air Force Heroes of The War of Resistance-WWII and Their Martyrdom). 东城区, 北京， 中国: 团结出版社, 2016. .

Further reading
 Andersson, Lennart. "Chinese 'Junks': Junkers Aircraft Exports to China 1925-1940". Air Enthusiast, No. 55, Autumn 1994, pp. 2–7. 
 Byrd, Martha: Chennault: Giving Wings to the Tiger, University of Alabama Press, 1987.
 Ford, Daniel: Flying Tigers: Claire Chennault and the American Volunteer Group, Smithsonian Institution Press, 1991.  
 Gordon, David M.: "The China-Japan War, 1931–1945", Journal of Military History, Vol. 70 (2006), No. 1, pp. 137–182.
 Leyvastre, Pierre. "The Day of the Dewoitine". Air Enthusiast Quarterly, No. 1, n.d., pp. 17–19, 84–96.  
 Liu, F. F. A Military History of Modern China, 1924–1949, Princeton University Press, 1956.
 Rasor, Eugene L.: The China-Burma-India Campaign, 1931–1945: Historiography and Annotated Bibliography, 1998. Available here..
 Sacca, John Wands: "Like Strangers in a Foreign Land: Chinese Officers Prepared at American Military Colleges, 1904–37." Journal of Military History, Vol. 70 (2006), No. 3, pp. 703–742.
 Schaller, Michael: "American Air Strategy in China, 1939–1941: The Origins of Clandestine Air Warfare," American Quarterly, Vol. 28 (1976), No. 1, pp. 3–19. JSTOR link.
 Smith, Felix: China Pilot: Flying for Chiang and Chennault, Smithsonian, 1995.
 Xu, Guangqiu: "The Chinese Air Force with American Wings." War & Society, Vol. 16 (1998), No. 1, pp. 61–81.
 Xu, Guangqiu: War Wings: The United States and Chinese Military Aviation, 1929–1949, Grove/Atlantic, 2001.

External links
Chinese aces of WW2
Information on Chinese airforce and Chinese aces
Chinese aces
 Porritt, Mamie. letters from Loiwing
Annals of the Chinese Air Force

20th century in China
China–Soviet Union relations
China–United States military relations
National Revolutionary Army
Republic of China Air Force
Second Sino-Japanese War
World War II Chinese aircraft